Cestayrols is a commune in the Tarn department in southern France.

Geography
The Vère flows southwestward through the northern part of the commune.

See also
Communes of the Tarn department

References

Communes of Tarn (department)